Leonas Baltrūnas (20 October 1914 – 20 April 1993) was a Lithuanian basketball player and coach. He won two gold medals with Lithuania national basketball team during EuroBasket 1937 and EuroBasket 1939.

Biography
In 1937 he graduated Kaunas Highs physical education courses, taught in Higher Technical School. Baltrūnas became interested in basketball in 1935 when he met with the basketball coach from the U.S. Konstantinas Savickas. He was member of Lithuania national basketball team (1936–1940) and participated in two EuroBaskets: EuroBasket 1937 and EuroBasket 1939. He won two gold medals during both competitions. In 1944 he moved to Germany, in 1949 he settled in Australia. In 1950 he organized Lithuanians basketball championship in Melbourne for the first time, established Lithuanians sports club "Varpas" and was physical education chairman. In 1949-1953 he was Victoria state and in 1955 Australia national basketball team coach, later he worked as physical education teacher at Swinburne Technical School in Hawthorn, Victoria. He also firmly contributed in popularizing volleyball in Victoria state. Leonas Baltrūnas once said:

Sport journalist Antanas Laukaitis describing him wrote:

References
Footnotes

Bibliography
 Vidas Mačiulis, Vytautas Gudelis. Halė, kurioje žaidė Lubinas ir Sabonis. 1939–1989 – Respublikinis sporto kombinatas, Kaunas, 1989
 Krepšinio kelias į Lietuvą, page 45.

1914 births
1993 deaths
FIBA EuroBasket-winning players
Lithuanian basketball coaches
Lithuanian men's basketball players
Lithuanian emigrants to Australia